Leonardo Kalil Abdala is a Brazilian footballer who plays as a forward for Oeste.J1 League club Albirex Niigata signed the 20-year old in 2016. Desde março de 2022, Kalil defende o Operário-PR como centroavante e ponta.

Youth

Recording two goals in the Copa São Paulo de Futebol Júnior, he was the top scorer for old outfit Criciuma's U-20 selection. The youngster asserted that it was because of essential daily training.

References

External links

Kalil at ZeroZero

1996 births
Living people
Brazilian footballers
Campeonato Brasileiro Série A players
Campeonato Brasileiro Série B players
J1 League players
Campeonato Brasileiro Série D players
Criciúma Esporte Clube players
Albirex Niigata players
Brazilian expatriate footballers
Brazilian expatriate sportspeople in Japan
Expatriate footballers in Japan
Association football forwards
União Esporte Clube players